

Oman
 Mombasa – Nasr ibn Abdallah al-Mazru‘i, Wali of Mombasa (1698–1728)

Ottoman Empire
 Principality of Abkhazia – Jigetshi (1700–1730)

Great Britain
 Massachusetts – Joseph Dudley, Governor of Massachusetts Bay Colony (1702–1715)

Portugal
 Angola – Military junta (1702–1705)
 Macau –
 Pedro Vaz de Sequeira, Governor of Macau (1702–1703)
 Jose da Gama Machado, Governor of Macau (1703–1706)

Colonial governors
Colonial governors
1703